Vladimir Ivić (born 7 May 1977) is a Serbian football manager and former player who is currently head coach of Krasnodar.

A former Serbia and Montenegro international, Ivić is best remembered for his time with Partizan and PAOK at club level.

After hanging up his boots, Ivić won back-to-back championship titles as Maccabi Tel Aviv manager in 2019 and 2020.

Club career
Ivić started out at Proleter Zrenjanin, making his senior debut in the 1994–95 season. He was transferred to Partizan in the summer of 1998. Over the next six years, Ivić helped the side win three championship titles and two domestic cups. He also made his UEFA Champions League debut in the 2003–04 campaign. After Saša Ilić's departure from the club in early 2004, Ivić became the team's captain. He scored a total of 64 league goals in 133 appearances with the Crno-beli.

In July 2004, Ivić signed a three-year contract with German club Borussia Mönchengladbach. He made just four league appearances and scored once in the team's 3–1 home victory over Werder Bremen, before transferring to AEK Athens in early 2005. After two and a half seasons in the Greek capital, Ivić signed with fellow Superleague club Aris Thessaloniki. He spent one year there, before switching to crosstown rivals PAOK in June 2008. Over the following four seasons, Ivić made 133 appearances and scored 24 goals across all competitions.

International career
At international level, Ivić was capped eight times by Serbia and Montenegro between 2001 and 2004, making his debut as a substitute for Dejan Stanković in a World Cup 2002 qualifier versus Switzerland, an eventual 1–1 draw. He was previously a member of the team that represented his nation at the Millennium Super Soccer Cup, winning the tournament.

Managerial career
In June 2013, Ivić started working with PAOK's under-20 team. He led the side to the league title in his first year in the role. In March 2016, Ivić was appointed manager of PAOK until the end of the season, following the departure of Igor Tudor. He would win the Greek Cup in May 2017, before leaving the post the following month.

On 31 May 2018, Ivić officially took charge of Israeli club Maccabi Tel Aviv, penning a two-year deal with an option for a third season. He won the national championship in his debut season with a record 31-point margin and only one loss. In his second season, Ivić led the team to another championship title, only losing in the final league fixture.

On 15 August 2020, Ivić was appointed as manager of Watford on a one-year contract with an option for a further year. He was released by the club on 19 December 2020, while placing fifth in the league.

Ivić returned to Maccabi Tel Aviv on 12 June 2022 on a two-year deal.

On 4 January 2023, Ivić was appointed manager of Russian Premier League club Krasnodar on a two-year deal.

Personal life
Ivić is the younger brother of fellow footballer Ilija Ivić.

Career statistics

Club

International

Managerial

Honours

Player
Partizan
 First League of FR Yugoslavia: 1998–99, 2001–02, 2002–03
 FR Yugoslavia Cup: 2000–01

Manager
PAOK
 Greek Cup: 2016–17
Maccabi Tel Aviv
 Israeli Premier League: 2018–19, 2019–20
 Toto Cup Al: 2018–19
 Israel Super Cup: 2019
Individual
 Super League Greece Manager of the Season: 2016–17
 EFL Championship Manager of the Month: November 2020

Notes

References

External links

 
 
 

AEK Athens F.C. players
Aris Thessaloniki F.C. players
Association football midfielders
Borussia Mönchengladbach players
Bundesliga players
Expatriate football managers in England
Expatriate football managers in Greece
Expatriate football managers in Israel
Expatriate football managers in Russia
Expatriate footballers in Germany
Expatriate footballers in Greece
FC Krasnodar managers
First League of Serbia and Montenegro players
FK Partizan players
FK Proleter Zrenjanin players
Israeli Premier League managers
PAOK FC managers
PAOK FC non-playing staff
PAOK FC players
Maccabi Tel Aviv F.C. managers
Russian Premier League managers
Serbia and Montenegro expatriate footballers
Serbia and Montenegro expatriate sportspeople in Germany
Serbia and Montenegro expatriate sportspeople in Greece
Serbia and Montenegro footballers
Serbia and Montenegro international footballers
Serbia and Montenegro under-21 international footballers
Serbian expatriate football managers
Serbian expatriate footballers
Serbian expatriate sportspeople in England
Serbian expatriate sportspeople in Greece
Serbian expatriate sportspeople in Israel
Serbian expatriate sportspeople in Russia
Serbian football managers
Serbian footballers
Sportspeople from Zrenjanin
Super League Greece managers
Super League Greece players
Watford F.C. managers
1977 births
Living people